Axioms is a peer-reviewed open access scientific journal that focuses on all aspects of mathematics, mathematical logic and mathematical physics. It was established in June 2012 and is published quarterly by MDPI.

In September 2021 the journal was among the initial 13 journals included in the official Norwegian list of possibly predatory journals, known as level X. In February 2022 is no longer on this list. According to the Journal Citation Reports, the journal has a 2021 impact factor of 1.824.

The editor-in-chief is Humberto Bustince (Public University of Navarre).

Abstracting and indexing
The journal is abstracted and indexed in:
Science Citation Index Expanded
Zentralblatt MATH
Scopus
 It is not indexed in MathSciNet.

References

External links 
 

Mathematics journals
Open access journals
Publications established in 2012
MDPI academic journals
Quarterly journals
English-language journals